The Gray Fossil Site is an Early Pliocene assemblage of fossils dating between 4.5 and 4.9 million years old, located near the town of Gray in Washington County, Tennessee. The site was discovered during road construction on Tennessee State Route 75 by the Tennessee Department of Transportation in May 2000, after which local officials decided to preserve the site for research and education. The site became part of East Tennessee State University, and the Gray Fossil Site & Museum was opened on the site in 2007.

The ancient habitat of the Gray Fossil Site was a pond formed within a sinkhole surrounded by a warm, wet forest. The fossils found at the site represent the ancient plants and animals that lived and died in and around the sinkhole pond.

As the first site of its age known from the Appalachian region, the Gray Fossil Site is a unique window into the past. Research at the site has yielded many surprising discoveries, including new species of red panda, rhinoceros, pond turtle, hickory tree, and more. The site also hosts the world's largest known assemblage of fossil tapirs.

Formation 
The Gray Fossil Site is a deposit of laminated clay and silt sediments laid down in an ancient lake that formed within a sinkhole. The deposit is oval in shape, covering an area of roughly 220 meters by 180 meters and ranging in depth from about 7 meters to 39 meters deep. The fossils within this deposit are abundant and often exceptionally well-preserved.

The site is situated within the Knox Group formation, a series of Cambrian-Ordovician limestones. Groundwater flowing through joints in these rocks creates caves and sinkholes, forming a region of karst topography. The sinkhole that contains the fossil-rich deposits of the Gray Fossil Site is the result of a series of overlapping collapse events that ultimately formed one large basin. Sizable boulders deposited within the lake sediments indicate that the edge of the sinkhole once featured high walls or overhangs where chunks of rock could occasionally break off.

Based on the assemblage of mammal fossils uncovered at the site, the main deposit is estimated to date between 4.5 and 4.9 million years old, during the Early Pliocene Epoch near the transition of the Hemphilian and Blancan Land Mammal Ages. There is some evidence from drill cores for more ancient deposits deeper within the site, resulting from earlier stages of sinkhole collapse.

History
In late May of 2000, this fossil-rich deposit was discovered during a Tennessee Department of Transportation road construction project on the outskirts of Gray, TN. As it became clear that the fossils were unusual for this part of the country, members of the local community began an effort to preserve the site. In September 2000, Tennessee Governor Don Sundquist announced that the construction project would be moved so the fossil site could be saved and dedicated to research and education.

The Gray Fossil Site then became a project of East Tennessee State University, which began hiring paleontologists and geologists to oversee the site and ultimately to create a new Department of Geosciences. The university founded the Don Sundquist Center of Excellence in Paleontology and began construction of an on-site museum to house research facilities and educational exhibits. The museum first opened in August 2007, originally known as the East Tennessee State University and General Shale Brick Natural History Museum and Visitor Center, but now known more simply as the Gray Fossil Site & Museum.

Paleoenvironment 
The Gray Fossil Site was once a lake or pond surrounded by forest. The ancient lake was home to a diverse community of aquatic animals, including fish, pond turtles, aquatic salamanders, beavers, and alligators. Plant fossils found at the site, particularly pollen, indicate that the dominant vegetation of the forest was oak, hickory, and pine trees, along with various herbaceous species. Estimates for the density of this forest have varied; earlier research suggested a moderately dense forest, while later study indicated that the site might have been more of an open woodland where disruptive factors such as large herbivores, frequent fire, and drought limited the development of a closed canopy.

A 2020 study used fossil mammal teeth as a proxy to estimate the ancient climate conditions of the Gray Fossil Site, estimating a mean annual temperature of 16.8°C (similar to modern-day Atlanta, GA) and annual precipitation of 1,343mm (similar to modern-day Tampa, FL), with the minimum temperature of the coldest month reaching 2.6°C. These results line up with earlier hypotheses that the site had a warmer and wetter climate than East Tennessee today based on the presence of warm-climate animals and plants like alligators, tupelo, and Corylopsis.

Many of the fossil fauna and flora of the Gray Fossil Site are closely related to modern-day species in Europe and Asia, including red pandas, European badgers, Chinese moonseed, and Corylopsis. This indicates that during the Early Pliocene, eastern North America maintained a biogeographic link with Eurasia.

Fossils
The Gray Fossil Site is a Lagerstätte that boasts a rich assemblage of well-preserved fossils. It is the only fossil site in the Appalachian region dating near the boundary between the Miocene and Pliocene Epochs, and it therefore offers a unique window into this region at this time.

Fish
So far, all of the fish fossils identified at the Gray Fossil Site belong to the family Centrarchidae.

Amphibians
 Salamanders. Several taxa have been identified, including Ambystoma, Desmognathus, Notophthalmus, and Plethodon. These are the oldest known members of their families in the Appalachian mountains, a region well-known for its modern salamander diversity.
Frogs. Numerous taxa, including Rana.

Reptiles
 Alligators. Several well-preserved specimens have been identified to the genus Alligator, but these appear to be distinct from known alligator species.
 Lizards. Identified lizards include skinks, anguids, and helodermatids.
Snakes. The most common snakes are colubrids, of which several species have been identified, including the endemic fossil species Zilantophis schuberti. Viperids are also present.
 Turtles. These are the most diverse group of reptiles at the site, including several taxa of box turtles, painted turtles, slider turtles, snapping turtles, and tortoises. Among these are two species only known from the Gray Site, the musk turtle Sternotherus palaeodorus and the slider turtle Trachemys haugrudi. The latter was named after Shawn Haugrud, the site's lab and field manager and lead preparator.

Birds 
A preliminary study in 2011 identified several families of birds at the Gray Fossil Site, the most common of which were ducks.

Mammals 
Perissodactyls (odd-toed hoofed mammals)

Tapirus polkensis (dwarf tapir). The Gray Fossil Site has the largest tapir population of any known fossil site, including fossil tapirs of all ages, from very young juveniles to old adults.
Teleoceras aepysoma (rhinoceros). Several specimens are known, including two nearly complete skeletons. In 2019, the Gray Fossil Site rhinos were identified as a new species, named the "high-bodied" Teleoceras for their longer front legs compared to other species.
Cormohipparion emslei (three-toed horse)

Artiodactyls (even-toed hoofed mammals)

 Peccaries. Two species have been identified: Mylohyus elmorei and Prosthennops serus.
 Pediomeryx.
 Camel, possibly Megatylopus

Carnivora

 Pristinailurus bristoli (red panda). Named as a new species in 2004. Two nearly complete skeletons make this one of the best-known fossil pandas in the world.
 Arctomeles dimolodontus (Eurasian badger). This species was named alongside the Gray Fossil Site panda in 2004.
 Gulo sudorus (wolverine). The oldest known fossil wolverine. Named the "sweaty wolverine" since the ancient climate of Gray was much warmer than modern wolverine habitats.
 Plionarctos (short-faced bear).
 Saber-toothed cat, possibly Machairodus.
 Buisnictis breviramus (skunk)
 Borophagus (bone crushing dog).

Proboscidea (elephants)

 Mastodon. Likely a new species, represented by several specimens, including one nearly complete and very large skeleton. Early findings of proboscidean fossils at Gray were originally believed to belong to a gomphothere.

Rodents

 Several species, including beavers, packrats, and mice.

Lagomorphs

 Alilepus vagus (rabbit)
 Notolagus lepusculus (rabbit)

Bats

 Two species of vespertilionid bats.

Eulipotyphla
 Several species of shrews and moles.
Xenarthra

 An unknown species of megalonychid sloth.

Invertebrates 
Aquatic invertebrates of the Gray Fossil Site include ostracods, snails, and small clams. Insects are also known from fossilized exoskeletal remains and trace fossils, including at least four different families of beetles.

Plants 
Plant fossils at the Gray Fossil Site include pollen, leaves, wood, fruits, seeds, and other structures which represent a diverse flora of angiosperms, conifers, ferns, lycophytes, and bryophytes. The forest flora was dominated by a variety of trees and shrubs, of which the most common were hickory, oak, and pine.

Several previously unknown extinct plant species have been identified at the Gray Fossil Site:

 Carya tennesseensis (hickory)
 Sinomenium macrocarpum (moonseed)
 Staphylea levisemia (bladdernut)
 Three species of Vitis (grapes) 
 Corylopsis grisea (witch hazel)
 Cavilignum pratchettii, the first extinct genus of plant identified at the Gray Fossil Site.

Algae 
Algal microfossils have been identified as numerous freshwater species, including one previously unknown extinct species, Stigmozygodites grayensis, named after the Gray Fossil Site in 2013.

Fungi 
Several types of fungi have been identified from microfossil remains of fungal tissue and fruiting bodies.

See also
 Ashfall Fossil Beds
 Pipe Creek Sinkhole
 La Brea Tar Pits
 List of fossil sites (with link directory)

References

External links
 ETSU Gray Fossil Site & Museum website
Research at the Gray Fossil Site
ETSU Natural History Museum & Gray Fossil Site YouTube Channel
 The Paleobiology Database: Gray Fossil Site Taxonomic List
Hands On! Discovery Center
 Friends of Gray Fossil Site
 Early photos and activities
 Tennessee State Web page

East Tennessee State University
Natural history of Tennessee
Miocene paleontological sites of North America
Protected areas of Washington County, Tennessee
Museums in Washington County, Tennessee
Natural history museums in Tennessee
Fossil parks in the United States
Paleontology in Tennessee
2000 in paleontology